Politics of Saint Lucia takes place in the framework of an independent parliamentary democratic constitutional monarchy, with King Charles III as its head of state, represented by a Governor General, who acts on the advice of the prime minister and the cabinet. The prime minister is the leader of the majority party of the house, and the cabinet conducts affairs of state. The Governor General exercises basically ceremonial functions, but residual powers, under the constitution, can be used at the governor general's discretion. The actual power in St. Lucia lies with the prime minister and the cabinet, usually representing the majority party in parliament.

History 

Politics in St. Lucia was once dominated by the United Workers' Party (UWP), which, until 1997 had governed the country for all but three years since independence. John Compton was premier of St. Lucia from 1964 until independence in February 1979.

The Saint Lucia Labour Party (SLP) won the first post-independence elections in July 1979, taking 12 of 17 seats in parliament. A period squabbling within the party ensued, which led to several changes of prime minister. Pressure from the private sector and the unions forced the government to resign in 1982. New elections were then called and were won resoundingly by Compton's UWP, which took 14 of 17 seats.

The UWP was elected for a second time on 16 April 1987, but with only nine of 17 seats. Seeking to increase his slim margin, Prime Minister Compton suspended parliament and called new elections on 30 April. This unprecedented snap election, however, gave the same results as before—the UWP retained nine seats and the SLP eight. In April 1992, Prime Minister Compton's government again defeated the SLP, but this time increased its majority in parliament to 11 of 17 seats.

In 1996, Compton announced his resignation as prime minister in favor of his chosen successor Dr. Vaughan Lewis, former director-general of the Organisation of Eastern Caribbean States (OECS). Dr. Lewis became prime minister and minister of finance, planning and development on 2 April 1996. The SLP also had a change of leadership with former CARICOM official Dr. Kenny Anthony succeeding businessman Julian Hunte.

In elections held 23 May 1997, the St. Lucia Labour Party won all but one of the 17 seats in Parliament, and Dr. Kenny Anthony became Prime Minister and Minister of Finance, Planning and Development on 24 May 1997.

In elections of 3 December 2001 the St. Lucia Labour Party won 14 of the 17 available seats. The leader of the UWP, Dr. Morella Joseph failed to win a seat. Arsene James is the leader of the Parliamentary Opposition.

In the general elections held on 11 December 2006 the UWP, once again led by Sir John Compton, defeated the SLP, winning 11 of the 17 seats. The next elections in St Lucia are constitutionally due in December 2011. The governing United Workers Party, and the opposition St Lucia Labour Party, along with the newly formed Lucian People's Movement, are expected to contest the next elections.

On 29 July 2021, Philip Joseph Pierre was sworn in as the 12th Prime Minister of St Lucia since independence in 1979. St Lucia Labour Party (SLP), led by Pierre, reached a clear victory in general election. The previous SLP administration, led by Kenny Anthony, was  during the period 2011-16. The United Workers Party (UWP) governed during the period 2016-21.

Executive branch
As head of state, King Charles III is represented by a governor general who acts on the advice of the prime minister and the cabinet. Following legislative elections, the leader of the majority party or leader of a majority coalition is usually appointed prime minister by the governor general; the deputy prime minister is appointed by the governor general.

Legislative branch
The Legislature has two chambers. The House of Assembly has 17 members, elected by universal adult suffrage for a five-year term in single-seat constituencies. The Senate has 11 members appointed by the governor general. 
The parliament may be dissolved by the governor general at any point during its 5-year term, either at the request of the prime minister—in order to take the nation into early elections—or at the governor general's own discretion, if the house passes a vote of no-confidence in the government.

Political parties and elections

Judicial branch
St. Lucia has an independent judiciary composed of district courts and a high court. Cases may be appealed to the Eastern Caribbean Supreme Court and, ultimately, to the Judicial Committee of the Privy Council in London. The island is divided into 10 administrative divisions, including the capital, Castries. Popularly elected local governments in most towns and villages perform such tasks as regulation of sanitation and markets and maintenance of cemeteries and secondary roads. St. Lucia has no army but maintains a paramilitary Special Service Unit within its police force and a coast guard.

Electoral boundaries

Saint Lucia's electoral boundaries are based, generally, on the 10 districts of Saint Lucia. There are 17 constituencies in Saint Lucia.

See also
Foreign relations of Saint Lucia
Governor-General of Saint Lucia

References